Krystle Esdelle (born ) is a Trinidad and Tobago female volleyball player, playing as an opposite spiker. She is part of the Trinidad and Tobago women's national volleyball team.

She participated at the 2011 Women's Pan-American Volleyball Cup.

References

External links

1984 births
Living people
Trinidad and Tobago women's volleyball players
Expatriate sportspeople in Turkey
Place of birth missing (living people)